Khalil Ahmed (3 March 1936 – 22 July 1997) was a Pakistani composer for radio, television, and films. He started his career with film Aanchal (1962) and remained one of the leading music directors in Pakistan in the 1960s. He composed several memorable songs for Pakistan Television in the late-1970s and 1980s.

Early life
Khalil Ahmed was born on 3 March 1936, in Agra, British India. He migrated to Pakistan in 1952.

Career

Film
Khalil Ahmed made his music debut with director Al-Hamid's film Aanchal (1962), which was released on 7 December 1962. Starring: Shamim Ara, Darpan, Saba and Talish. The song "kisi chaman mein raho, bahar ban ke raho" (singer Ahmed Rushdi) became a smash hit in Pakistan and established Khalil's name as a film composer. He quickly became one of the stalwarts of Pakistani film industry.

Khalil Ahmed always had his finger on the pulse of what the listeners wanted to hear on radio, television and in his films. He composed music for film Khamosh Raho (1964)  and recorded a Nazm in Ahmed Rushdi's voice Mein nahi manta (lyrics Habib Jalib) which became famous all over Pakistan.

He also gave hit music of film Khilona (1967). The songs "Chand se chandni" and "Gul kahoon khushboo kahoon" both recorded in Ahmed Rushdi's voice were very popular. An accomplished composer for television and films, Khalil's many contributions to music had made him a popular Pakistani film music composer. For example:"Uss kay gham ko kya kahayye" (singer: Mehdi Hassan,  film Guriya, producer-director: Himayat Ali Shair. This film could not be released. Khalil Ahmed was a specialist in sad compositions and he became one of the top composers of the 1960s after composing the songs of film Kaneez (1965 film). Song "Jab rat dhali tum yaad aye" (singer Mala and Ahmed Rushdi) became a popular song. His last movie, "Anokha Piyar", was released in 1994. Khalil Ahmed was one of Pakistan film industry's prominent musicians in the 1960s and 1970s, composing film music in over 40 films.

Television
In 1978, Khalil began hosting a music program for children, which was telecast from the Pakistan Television, Lahore station. It was called "Hum Kaliyan Hum Taare" with co- host Nayyara Noor, Tahira Syed and the young Niazi Brothers (known as folk singers Babar and Javed Niazi in 2018). After joining PTV, he composed some memorable songs using voices of most prominent singers of the time; Nayyara Noor, Nahid Akhtar, Farida Khanum, Amanat Ali Khan, Masood Rana, Musarrat Nazir, to name a few. His melody, "Insha Jee Uthho Ab Kooch Karo", penned by Ibn-e-Insha and sang by Amanat Ali Khan, became an all-time-classic.

Popular television songs

Super-hit film songs

Death
Khalil Ahmed died on 22 July 1997, in Lahore, Pakistan at age 61.

References

External links
Filmography of music director Khalil Ahmed on IMDb website

1936 births
1997 deaths
Muhajir people
Pakistani film score composers
People from Agra
Musicians from Lahore
20th-century composers
Pakistani musicians
Pakistani composers